was a Japanese consumer electronics company that was established in 1958 in Osaka, Japan. Their devices were branded as "Orion". The company used to be called Orion Electric, until Brain and Capital Holdings, Inc. (Japanese company) acquired it in 2019. From 1984 to their acquisition, their headquarters were based in Echizen, Fukui, Japan. Products manufactured and sold under the Orion brand included transistor radios, radio/cassette recorders, car stereos, and home stereo systems. Before their acquisition, they were of the world's largest OEM television and video equipment manufacturers, primarily supplying major-brand OEM customers. Orion produced around six million televisions and twelve million DVD player and TV combo units each year until 2019. Most of their products were manufactured in Thailand.

The Orion Group employed in excess of 9,000 workers. They had factories and offices in Japan, Thailand, Poland, the United Kingdom, and the United States. Orion's flagship factories in Thailand were one of Thailand’s top exporters, and they were recognized with an award from the Thai Government for their contribution.

Orion manufactured products primarily for Memorex, Otake, Hitachi, JVC, Emerson, and Sansui. In the North American market, Orion manufactured many televisions and VCRs for Emerson Radio during the 1980s and 1990s, but when Emerson Radio went bankrupt in 2000, the Emerson brand and their assets were bought by Orion’s primary competitor, Funai. During the 1990s, Orion and another of their brand names, World, were exclusively sold by Wal-Mart. The products sold consisted of discounted televisions, TV/VCR combos, and VHS players. In 2001, Orion partnered with Toshiba to manufacture smaller CRT and LCD televisions and DVD/VCR combos for the North American until 2009. In 2011, Orion licensed the JVC name for televisions. Until 2019, all JVC televisions were designed, produced, and supported by Orion. Orion also manufactured OEM televisions for Hitachi. Most of these TVs were sold at Wal-Mart and Sam's Club stores. Orion also operated Orion Sales, headquartered in Olney, Illinois, for the North American market, using their privately-owned Sansui brand, and their recently licensed JVC television brand. Orion Sales ceased to exist in 2016, and was sold to Elitelux Technologies.

On March 31, 2015, Orion Electric Co., Ltd. had reached insolvency and appointed provisional liquidators, due to poor sales by severe low price competition worldwide. However, on April 1, 2015, the "new" Orion Electric Co., Ltd. was established, and took over previous Orion Electric business. On January 19, 2019, Orion Co., Ltd., a subsidiary of the Doshisha Corporation in Osaka, took over the Orion brands and businesses. On May 20, 2019, Orion Electric Co., Ltd. had once again reached insolvency. Due to the lack of continuing funds, the Orion Electric Co., Ltd. ceased to exist, with all assets and holdings presumably owned by the Doshisha Corporation.

External links
en/ Orion Electric Co., Ltd. (English)

Electronics companies established in 1958
Display technology companies
Japanese companies established in 1958
Electronics companies of Japan
Radio manufacturers